After George Herriman conceived the Krazy Kat comic strip in 1913, the title character began appearing in animated shorts three years later. From 1916 to 1940, Krazy Kat was featured in 231 films. The following is a list of the cartoons released theatrically, separated by studio.

International Film Service

Bray Productions

* Directed by Vernon Stallings

Winkler Pictures
In the first two cartoon series', Krazy was depicted as a genderless feline, similar to the comic strip. From here onward, Krazy is portrayed as a male cat.

R-C Pictures/Winkler Pictures

Paramount-Famous/Winkler Pictures

**Directed by Bill Nolan

Columbia Pictures/Screen Gems
By this period, the Krazy Kat shorts started using sound. Every film here was directed by Manny Gould and Ben Harrison. Most of these shorts are available from various online sources. In 1931, Winkler Productions was renamed The Charles Mintz Studio and in 1933, The Charles Mintz Studio was renamed Screen Gems. Due to waning popularity, the Krazy Kat series ended, but he would appear in two more shorts in the Fables and Phantasies series.

References

External links
 

Film series introduced in 1916
Krazy Kat
 
 
Articles containing video clips